Pedro Daniel da Cunha Pereira de Sousa (born 3 October 1984) is a Portuguese football manager. He is the current manager of Portuguese Primeira Liga club Gil Vicente.

After working as a long-term assistant manager to André Villas-Boas, he started managing in his own right in the Primeira Liga in 2022.

Coaching career

Assistant
Sousa first met the Portuguese coach André Villas-Boas when the former was a student at the University of Porto, in the Faculty of Sports. He interviewed Villas-Boas about strategies for attacking football as part of his final-year thesis, and was later recommended to the young manager by professor of football José Guilherme, who was Villas-Boas' assistant at Académica. Sousa was Villas-Boas' match analyst at Académica, Porto, Chelsea, Tottenham Hotspur, and Zenit Saint Petersburg, and assistant manager at Zenit Shanghai Port and Marseille spanning 10 years of service.

Gil Vicente
On 16 November 2022, he was named manager of the Portuguese Primeira Liga side Gil Vicente, replacing Ivo Vieira.

Managerial statistics

References

External links
 
 Ogol profile

1984 births
Living people
People from Barcelos, Portugal
Portuguese football managers
Primeira Liga managers
Gil Vicente F.C. managers
FC Porto non-playing staff
Chelsea F.C. non-playing staff
Tottenham Hotspur F.C. non-playing staff
FC Zenit Saint Petersburg non-playing staff
Shanghai Port F.C. non-playing staff
Olympique de Marseille non-playing staff
Portuguese expatriate football managers
Portuguese expatriate sportspeople in England
Portuguese expatriate sportspeople in Russia
Portuguese expatriate sportspeople in China
Portuguese expatriate sportspeople in France
University of Porto alumni